Froger is a surname. Notable people with the surname include:

René Froger (born 1960), Dutch singer
Thierry Froger (born 1963), French footballer and coach
Maarten Froger (born 1977), Dutch field-hockey player

See also
Roger